Selda Gunsel is a Turkish-American chemical engineer. She is currently President of Shell Global Solutions and Vice President (VP) for Global Commercial Technology at Royal Dutch Shell.

Education 
She received her BSc in Chemical Engineering from Istanbul Technical University and an MSc and PhD in Chemical Engineering from Pennsylvania State University.

Research and career 
She joined Pennzoil as a research scientist in 1986. While at Pennzoil, she undertook several sabbatical assignments in the Tribology Group at Imperial College London to work with Professor Hugh Spikes. During this time she published several papers on antiwear and viscosity modifier lubricant additives. In 2000, she was appointed VP for Technology Development and Innovation at Pennzoil.

She moved to Shell in 2002, and has fulfilled a number of roles including; VP of Fuels and Engine Vehicle Technology, General Manager (GM) of Global Products & Quality, GM of Lubricants Technology Americas and GM of Global Strategic R&D. She was appointed to her current role as VP for Global Commercial Technology in 2017.

She has served as both the President of the Society of Tribologists and Lubrication Engineers (STLE) and as the Chairman of the Society of Automotive Engineers (SAE) Lubricants Research Award Board.

In 2013, she was made an Honorary Professor at the State Key Laboratory of Tribology (SKLT) at Beijing's Tsinghua University. She is a Fellow of the STLE and was awarded the STLE International Award in 2015.

Gunsel was elected as a Member of the US National Academy of Engineering in 2017 for leadership in developing and manufacturing advanced fuels and lubricants to meet growing global energy demand while reducing  emissions.

References 

Living people
American people of Turkish descent
Year of birth missing (living people)
Penn State College of Engineering alumni
American mechanical engineers
American women engineers
Members of the United States National Academy of Engineering
Tribologists
21st-century American women